Sadhana Singh is an Indian film and television actor. Sadhana was born in rajput family Varanasi, Uttar Pradesh. Her family hailed from the Indian state of Punjab. Her first magazine shot was done by Pardeep Mishra. She started her film career with the 1982 film Nadiya Ke Paar, by writer-director Govind Moonis. Sadhana became a hit after the release of the film and started being called Gunja, the character she played in the film Nadiya Ke Paar. Gunja was an innocent looking village girl who fell in love with Chandan (Played by Sachin), brother-in-law of her elder sister, in the film. She has acted in more than twenty Bollywood and Indian regional language films. Goggles of Rajesh Khanna, Jugni and Mukkabaaz (by Anurag Kashyap) are some of her recent films. Apart from films, she also acted in many popular TV serials.

Personal life
She is married to film producer Rajkumar Shahabadi. Rajkumar is the son of Vishwanath Prasad Shahabadi - a film producer from Shahabad who was involved in producing Bhojpuri cinema's first film, Ganga Maiyya Tohe Piyari Chadhaibo. The couple have a daughter and a son. Her daughter Sheena Shahabadi is also an actress.

Filmography

|18
|Dronacharya (Short Film)
|2022
|Shakuntala Shashtri
|}

TV series
 Maan
Saarrthi
Pyar Zindagi Hai
Pyaar Ke Do Naam: Ek Raadha, Ek Shyaam
Prratima
Phulwa
Kis Desh Mein Hai Meraa Dil
Kabhi To Milenge
Hamari Sister Didi
Ghar Jamai
Chalti Ka Naam Antakshar
Santoshi Maa as Vidya Raghavendra Mishra (2015 - 2017)

References

External links
 
 

Year of birth missing (living people)
Living people
Actresses from Varanasi
Indian television actresses
Indian film actresses
20th-century Indian actresses
21st-century Indian actresses
Actresses in Hindi cinema
Actresses in Hindi television